The 2015–16 Rider Broncs men's basketball team represented Rider University during the 2015–16 NCAA Division I men's basketball season. The Broncs, led by fourth year head coach Kevin Baggett, played their home games at Alumni Gymnasium and were members of the Metro Atlantic Athletic Conference. They finished the season 13–20, 8–12 in MAAC play to finish in a tie for seventh place. They defeated Quinnipiac in the first round of the MAAC tournament to advance to the quarterfinals where they lost to Monmouth.

Roster

Schedule

|-
!colspan=9 style="background:#900B36; color:#FFFFFF;"| Exhibition

|-
!colspan=9 style="background:#900B36; color:#FFFFFF;"| Regular season

|-
!colspan=9 style="background:#900B36; color:#FFFFFF;"| MAAC tournament

References

Rider Broncs men's basketball seasons
Rider
Rider Broncs
Rider Broncs